Sea Cliff Village Hall, Library and Museum Complex is a historic civic building complex located at Sea Cliff in Nassau County, New York.  The complex is a grouping of three functional units in two interconnected buildings originally built in 1914 as the Sea Cliff Methodist Church, Sunday School / Chapel, and Rectory.  It is constructed of beige brick with cast stone accents and slate-covered roofs in the Late Gothic Revival or Collegiate Gothic style.  It features a square bell tower. The former rectory contains the museum and is a two-story rectangular building in the Tudor Revival style.

It was listed on the National Register of Historic Places in 2005.

References

External links
Sea Cliff Village Museum
Sea Cliff Village Library
Village of Sea Cliff

Government buildings on the National Register of Historic Places in New York (state)
Gothic Revival architecture in New York (state)
Tudor Revival architecture in New York (state)
Churches completed in 1914
Museums in Nassau County, New York
National Register of Historic Places in Nassau County, New York
City and town halls on the National Register of Historic Places in New York (state)
Libraries on the National Register of Historic Places in New York (state)

Village halls in the United States